Slovakia competed at the 2013 World Championships in Athletics in Moscow, Russia, from 10–18 August 2013. A team of 11 athletes was announced to represent the country in the event.

Results

(q – qualified, NM – no mark, SB – season best)

Men

Women

See also
Slovakia at other World Championships in 2013
 Slovakia at the 2013 UCI Road World Championships
 Slovakia at the 2013 World Aquatics Championships

References

External links
IAAF World Championships 2013 – Slovak Republic

Nations at the 2013 World Championships in Athletics
World Championships in Athletics
Slovakia at the World Championships in Athletics